"Higher Than Higher" is a song by the British pop group Take That. It was released by Polydor Records on 8 June 2015 as the third single from their seventh studio album, III (2014). It was written by Take That, Mattias Larsson, Robin Fredriksson and Joe Janiak, and produced by Mattman & Robin with Gary Barlow on lead vocals.

The song entered the UK Physical Singles Chart at number one shortly after release.

Background
On 28 April 2015, it was announced that "Higher Than Higher" would be the third single from III. It was officially released as a CD single on 8 June 2015.

Critical reception
The single received positive reviews on its release, with Music News calling it a "trademark soaring smash" and The Guardian commenting that the single is "lilting and uplifting in a way that avoids pop's obsession with heavy-handed didacticism". The paper praised its production, calling it "spacious and precise, with each different element – the marching-band beat, the acoustic strums, the echoey synths – all meticulously layered".

Chart performance
"Higher Than Higher" entered the UK Physical Singles Chart at number one on 14 June 2015 and remained in the charts for four weeks.

Personnel
Gary Barlow – lead vocals
Howard Donald – backing vocals
Mark Owen – backing vocals

Track listing
UK CD single
 "Higher Than Higher" – 4:06	
 "Higher Than Higher" (instrumental) – 4:06

Charts

Release history

References

2014 songs
2015 singles
Take That songs
Pop ballads
Songs written by Gary Barlow
Songs written by Mark Owen
Songs written by Howard Donald
Polydor Records singles
Songs written by Mattias Larsson
Songs written by Robin Fredriksson
Songs written by Joe Janiak
Song recordings produced by Mattman & Robin